K-1 World Grand Prix 2008 Final was a martial arts event held by the K-1 on Saturday December 6, 2008 at the Yokohama Arena in Yokohama, Japan. It was the 16th K-1 World GP Final, the culmination of a year full of regional elimination tournaments. All fights followed the classic 8-man tournament format and were conducted under K-1 rules; three rounds of three minutes each, with a possible tiebreaker. The qualification for the top eight fighters in this event was held at K-1 World Grand Prix 2008 in Seoul Final 16.

Final 8 match ups
The drawing of the final 8 match ups took place in the ring right after the final 8 had been determined in Seoul, Korea. A random draw assigned the selection order and the fighters one by one made their way to a stage. First, Ruslan Karaev chose the third fight, next up was Bonjasky who opted for the fourth fight. Zimmerman went to the second bout. Saki, selecting fourth, matched himself up with Karaev. Selecting next, Teixeira decided Zimmerman in the second bout. Aerts eschewed a match-up with Bonjasky, instead of still-empty first bout. LeBanner, with the option of Aerts or Bonjasky, put himself in against the latter. Hari therefore ended up with Aerts.

K-1 World GP 2008 bracket

Results

See also
List of K-1 events
K-1 World Grand Prix
List of K-1 champions
List of male kickboxers

References

External links
K-1 WGP 2008 Official Website
K-1 Official Website

K-1 events
2008 in kickboxing
Kickboxing in Japan
Sport in Yokohama